Hoodlum Priest is the 3rd and possibly final album from UK industrial and trip hop band Hoodlum Priest. This album features an Egyptian theme sampling various bits of Egyptian mythology and experiments with elements of Drum n Bass and Indian/African influenced music. This album also features vocals from former Gaye Bykers on Acid frontman Ian Hoxley (on this album called "Mary Magdelyte").

The song Gas was recorded with longtime collaborator Cliff Hewitt, and was recorded in Helsinki from the Ambient City project.

Track listing
Can You Feel This
Naked Time
You Know Who I Am
No Fear
Slow and Low
Gas
Addicts
We Walk the Earth

Samples used

"Addicts" samples the film Naked Lunch
"Naked time" samples the film Twins of Evil

References

1998 albums